St. Olav's Guild was a guild in Tallinn, Estonia. The guild was named after Olaf II of Norway.

The guild was established probably in 13th or 14th century. The first mentioning was in 1341.

The guild was composed by artisans.

In 1689, the guild was closed and most of its members were joined with Canute Guild.

References

Organizations based in Tallinn
History of Tallinn